Glenea interrupta is a species of beetle in the family Cerambycidae. It was described by James Thomson in 1860.

Subspecies
 Glenea interrupta densepunctata Breuning, 1958
 Glenea interrupta interrupta Thomson, 1860

References

interrupta
Beetles described in 1860